Tove  is a 2020 Finnish biographical film about Swedish-speaking Finnish author and illustrator Tove Jansson, creator of the Moomins. The film was directed by Zaida Bergroth from a script by Eeva Putro, and stars Alma Pöysti in the titular role.

The film's budget, at €3.4 million, made it the second most expensive Finnish film, following the 2017 version of The Unknown Soldier. Tove was released to critical acclaim, and was selected as the Finnish entry for the Best International Feature Film award at the 93rd Academy Awards, but was not nominated.

Plot 
The film follows the early life of Tove Jansson from the end of World War II to the mid-1950s, showing her romantic relationships with the politician Atos Wirtanen and the theatre director Vivica Bandler, as well as the creation and publication of the Moomins.

Cast 
 Alma Pöysti as Tove Jansson
 Krista Kosonen as Vivica Bandler
 Shanti Roney as Atos Wirtanen
 Joanna Haartti as Tuulikki Pietilä
 Eeva Putro as Maya Vanni
 Jakob Öhrman as Sam Vanni
 Robert Enckell as Viktor 'Faffan' Jansson
 Kajsa Ernst as Signe 'Ham' Jansson
 Wilhelm Enckell as Lars Jansson

Release 
Tove screened at the Toronto International Film Festival in September 2020. The film was released in Finland on 2 October 2020.

Reception 
Tove was positively received by critics, with Pöysti's performance in the titular role garnering critical acclaim. Variety described Pöysti's performance as "mesmerizing", stating she "excels in her first leading film role and strongly resembles the real Tove". They were also positive about Bergroth's direction, commenting that she "flexes her considerable cinematic powers, conjuring vibrantly expressive visuals and confident performances from her talented cast."

Accolades 
Tove won seven Jussi Awards, including Best Film and Best Actress for Pöysti. This was the most awards won by a Swedish-language Finnish film.

See also
 List of submissions to the 93rd Academy Awards for Best International Feature Film
 List of Finnish submissions for the Academy Award for Best International Feature Film

Other related 
 Comet in Moominland (film)

Notes

References

External links 
 
 
 Anthony Lane: Why Movies Love Kids’ Books at The New Yorker

2020 biographical drama films
2020 LGBT-related films
Finnish biographical drama films
Finnish LGBT-related films
Swedish-language films from Finland
Films set in Finland
Lesbian-related films
Biographical films about artists
Films set in Helsinki
Moomins
Film
Biographical films about writers
Cultural depictions of cartoonists